The 2018 Upper Austria Ladies Linz was a women's tennis tournament played on indoor hard courts. It was the 32nd edition of the Linz Open, and part of the WTA International tournaments-category of the 2018 WTA Tour. It was held at the TipsArena Linz in Linz, Austria, from 8 to 14 October 2018.

Points and prize money

Point distribution

Prize money

1 Qualifiers prize money is also the Round of 32 prize money
* per team

Singles entrants

Seeds 

 Rankings as of October 1, 2018

Other entrants 
The following players received wildcards into the singles main draw:
  Harriet Dart
  Barbara Haas
  Andrea Petkovic

The following player received entry through a protected ranking:
  Margarita Gasparyan

The following players received entry from the qualifying draw:
  Ekaterina Alexandrova
  Anna Blinkova
  Fiona Ferro
  Valentini Grammatikopoulou
  Anna Karolína Schmiedlová
  Jil Teichmann

The following player received entry as a lucky loser:
  Kristýna Plíšková

Withdrawals
Before the tournament
 Dominika Cibulková → replaced by  Kristýna Plíšková
 Anett Kontaveit → replaced by  Vera Lapko
 Rebecca Peterson → replaced by  Stefanie Vögele

Retirements
 Monica Puig

Doubles entrants

Seeds 

1 Rankings as of October 1, 2018

Other entrants 
The following pairs received wildcards into the doubles main draw:
  Melanie Klaffner /  Viktória Kužmová
  Mavie Österreicher  /  Nadja Ramskogler

Champions

Singles 

  Camila Giorgi def.  Ekaterina Alexandrova, 6–3, 6–1

Doubles 

  Kirsten Flipkens /  Johanna Larsson def.  Raquel Atawo /  Anna-Lena Grönefeld, 4–6, 6–4, [10–5]

References

External links 
 

2018 WTA Tour
2018
Upper Austria Ladies Linz
Upper Austria Ladies Linz
Generali